Bucolicum carmen is an organic collection of twelve eclogues, composed by Petrarch from  1346–7 and published in 1357. The last (Aggelos) contains the dedication of the sylloge to Donato Albanzani.

Overview 

The dark allegories suggested by the verses are in part explained in the letter that Boccaccio sent Martino da Signa (Ep. XXIII), which some manuscripts give in front of the collection of poems, by way of introduction. In this document, after having briefly gone into the history of the genre and having indicated its main exponents to be Theocritus, Virgil and Petrarch, Boccaccio undertakes an exercise in self-exegesis, in the best of Dantean tradition. Dante's influence can be seen in the themes and means used in the correspondence between Alighieri and Giovanni del Virgilio, the famous exchange of eclogues that Boccaccio personally copied and that is among the documents in the Zibaldone Laurenziano XXIX 8.

The  deals with a variety of themes. The first two compositions (Galla and Pampinea) are said by the author himself to be as if they were youthful exercises; in Faunus, Dorus, Silva cadens and Alcestus facts and events related to the Angevin court are elevated to the rank of parenthetic exemplification. With Midas Boccaccio denounces the untrustworthiness of Niccolò Acciaiuoli, thus vindicating his influential friend's “betrayal”. The autobiographical element would seem to be central to the Olympia, a sad and touching recollection of his baby daughter Violante, who had died at the early age of five.

References

External links 

 Il Bucolicum Carmen, with an introduction in Italian by Antonio Avena

Epic poems in Latin
Second Punic War
Poetry by Petrarch